Nkozi Hospital is a hospital in Nkozi, Mpigi District,  in the Central Region of Uganda. It is a private, non-profit, community hospital, serving the town of Nkozi and surrounding areas of southern Mawokota County. The hospital also serves as the nearest and hospital of first choice for the staff and students of Uganda Martyrs University, located in the same town.

Location
The hospital is located in the  parliamentary constituency of Mawokota County South, off of the Kampala–Masaka Road.

The geographical coordinates of Nkozi Hospital are: 0°00'09.0"N, 32°00'59.0"E (Latitude=0.002490, Longitude=32.016381).

Overview
During the Uganda-Tanzania War, which toppled Idi Amin, the hospital received extensive damage to buildings and equipment. The X-ray unit damaged during that war was replaced in 2007 through a donation from the Government of Japan.

The hospital is owned by the Roman Catholic Archdiocese of Kampala. It is accredited to the Uganda Catholic Medical Bureau and is managed by the Sisters of Immaculate Heart of Mary Reparatrix. The hospital, as of December 2004 was staffed by three doctors who performed surgeries, clinical assistants, midwives, nurses, nursing assistants, and other support staff, totaling 107 people. In addition, the hospital serves as the teaching hospital for students pursuing the Master of Science in Health Services Management degree at Uganda Martyrs University, also in Nkozi.

Nkozi Hospital generates 90 percent of its income locally, with patient user-fees accounting for an average of 51.4 percent of total hospital income. As of December 2019, the hospital averaged  30,998 annual outpatient visits, 5,885 annual inpatient admissions and 1,800 annual maternal deliveries. Its annual bed occupancy ratio averaged 57 percent, and its annual caesarian rate averaged 22.2 percent.

See also
List of hospitals in Uganda
Uganda Martyrs University

References

External links
 Official Website
 Our Lady Health Of The Sick - Ggogonya Sisters

Hospital
Hospital buildings completed in 1942
Hospitals in Uganda
Mpigi District
Central Region, Uganda
1942 establishments in Uganda
Catholic hospitals in Africa
Teaching hospitals in Uganda